Ayutthaya Station, is the main railway station of Phra Nakhon Si Ayutthaya province. It is owned by the State Railway of Thailand and is served by the Northern Line and the Northeastern Line. It serves 77 trains per day, equivalent to 10,000-12,000 people passing through daily. It is 71 kilometres from Bangkok railway station. Every passenger train passing this station must stop here.

History

Ayutthaya railway station was built during the reign of King Chulalongkorn. Its name was "Krung Kao", in relation to the nearby Ayutthaya Historical Park. In 1921, it was rebuilt as a concrete building with metal bracing and renamed "Ayutthaya" in keeping with King Vajiravudh's national order of 1917. The name and structure remains in use today.

References

External links

 

Railway stations in Thailand